The Biryuk (Büürük) is a river in Yakutia (Sakha Republic), Russia.

The river flows across an uninhabited area of the Olyokminsky District. Biryuk village is located by its left bank, close to its confluence with the Lena  from Olyokminsk.

Course  
The Biryuk is a left tributary of the Lena. It is formed in the Lena Plateau. The river heads in a roughly southern direction across a taiga area. In its lower course it bends to the south before the Lena floodplain and flows slowly and meandering in a swampy channel.

There are lakes in its basin, including relatively large Ebye Kyuel. The river freezes yearly between October and May.

See also
List of rivers of Russia

References

External links 
Fishing & Tourism in Yakutia

Central Siberian Plateau
Rivers of the Sakha Republic